Kotak Mahindra Bank Limited is an Indian banking and financial services company headquartered in Mumbai. It offers banking products and financial services for corporate and retail customers in the areas of personal finance, investment banking, life insurance, and wealth management. It is India's third largest private sector bank by market capitalisation after HDFC Bank and ICICI Bank.  the bank has 1600 branches and 2519 ATMs.

History
In 1985, Uday Kotak founded Kotak Capital Management Finance as an investment and financial services company, with a loan of 30 lakh from family and friends. In 1986, Anand Mahindra and his father Harish Mahindra invested 1 lakh in the company and it was subsequently renamed as Kotak Mahindra Finance. The company was initially engaged in bill discounting, along with lease and hire purchase activities.

In the early 1990s, the company started car financing and investment banking services, and expanded its operations overseas. In 1996, car financing company Kotak Mahindra Primus was incorporated as a 60:40 joint venture between Kotak Mahindra Finance and Ford Credit International. In the same year, Kotak Mahindra Finance hived off its investment banking division into a new company, Kotak Mahindra Capital, started in partnership with Goldman Sachs.

In 1998, Kotak Mahindra Finance started its mutual fund arm called Kotak Mahindra AMC. In 2001, OM Kotak Mahindra Life Insurance was established as a 74:26 joint venture between Kotak Mahindra Finance and Old Mutual.

In February 2003, Kotak Mahindra Finance received a banking licence from the Reserve Bank of India. With this, it became the first non-banking finance company in India to be converted into a bank. Kotak Mahindra Finance was then renamed as Kotak Mahindra Bank. At the time, Uday Kotak had 56% stake in the company while Anand Mahindra held 5%.

In 2005, Kotak Mahindra Bank acquired Ford Credit's 40% stake in Kotak Mahindra Primus, making it a wholly-owned subsidiary of the group. Kotak Mahindra Primus was subsequently renamed as Kotak Mahindra Prime.

With the merger completed in 2015, Kotak Mahindra Bank had almost 40,000 employees, and the number of branches reached 1,261. After the merger, ING Group, which controlled ING Vysya Bank, obtained a 6.5% stake in Kotak Mahindra Bank.

In 2015, Kotak Mahindra General Insurance, a wholly-owned subsidiary of Kotak Mahindra Bank, started operations after receiving IRDAI's approval. In 2016, Bharti Airtel and Kotak Mahindra Bank started a 80:20 joint venture called Airtel Payments Bank.

In March 2017, Kotak Mahindra Bank launched an online savings account called Kotak 811, named after the date Prime Minister Narendra Modi had announced demonetisation in the previous year, which according to Uday Kotak was "the day that changed India." Kotak 811 helped the bank double its number of customers by September 2018.

In the same year, Kotak Mahindra Group acquired the vehicle financing portfolio of Volkswagen Finance India and passenger vehicle financing portfolio of Ford Credit India. In 2022, it acquired the agriculture and healthcare equipment financing portfolio of DLL India.

Subsidiaries and associates 
Major subsidiaries of the Bank include 

 Kotak Mahindra Prime
 Kotak Mahindra Investments
 Kotak Securities
 Kotak Mahindra Capital
 Kotak Mahindra Life Insurance
 Kotak Mahindra General Insurance
 Kotak AMC
 Kotak Investment Advisors
 Kotak Capital Company

Recognition

Philanthropy 
In 2020, Kotak pledged to donate  to the PM CARES Fund to fight against the COVID-19 pandemic in India.

See also

 Banking in India
 List of banks in India
 Indian Financial System Code

References

External links 

Banks based in Mumbai
Banks established in 2003
NIFTY 50
Financial services companies of India
1985 establishments in Maharashtra
BSE SENSEX
Kotak Mahindra Bank
Indian companies established in 1985
Companies listed on the National Stock Exchange of India
Companies listed on the Bombay Stock Exchange